Eyüp Can may refer to:

Eyüp Can (boxer) (born 1964), retired Turkish boxer
Eyüp Can (journalist) (born 1973), Turkish journalist